1 Corinthians 16 is the sixteenth and final chapter of the First Epistle to the Corinthians in the New Testament of the Christian Bible. It is authored by Paul the Apostle and Sosthenes in Ephesus, composed between 52–55 CE, and sent to the church in Corinth. This chapter contains the closing statements of the letter, with Paul's travel plans, final instructions, and greetings. Verse 8 confirms that Paul was in Ephesus when the letter was composed, and verse 21 confirms that the majority of the letter was scribed by an amanuensis.

Text

The original text was written in Koine Greek. This chapter is divided into 24 verses.

Textual witnesses
Some early manuscripts containing the text of this chapter are:
Codex Vaticanus (AD 325–350)
Codex Sinaiticus (330–360)
Codex Alexandrinus (400–440)
Codex Ephraemi Rescriptus (~450; complete).
Codex Freerianus (~450; extant verses 1–2, 12–13)
Codex Claromontanus (~550)

Arranging the collection (16:1–4)
Verses 1–4 discuss the fifth matter the Corinthians wrote about (others previously being in 7:1, 25; 8:1; 12:1) regarding the money collected for the poor Christians in Jerusalem.

Paul's travel arrangements (16:5–9)

In verses 5–9, Paul details that he expects to spend the winter in Corinth, to get them participating in his future ministry, and also desires to visit Rome, but he planned to remain in Ephesus until Pentecost, due to a good evangelistic opportunities in that city.

Timothy's proposed visit (16:10–11)
In verses 10–11, Paul asks that Timothy is to be well received when he comes to visit them, be protected from enmity and be given provision of his needs for travel.

The return of Apollos (16:12–14)
The sixth and final matter the Corinthians wrote is to ask for the return of Apollos, but it is clear from 1:12; 3:4; 4:6 that the motives could be suspect, that is, as an alternative of Paul's return. Nonetheless, Paul urges Apollos to go. On the other hand, Apollos responded that "it was not at all the will that he now come" and "he will come when he has the opportunity", suggesting that Apollos understood the bad timing to accept the invitation ("would not be in the interests of the congregation") at this time of tension between Paul and the church there. Interestingly, "Apollos was content for Paul to reply on his behalf".

The godly example of the household of Stephanas (16:15–18)
In verses 15–18, the members of the household of Stephanas were "the earliest fruits of Paul's ministry in Corinth, and they have used their resources to help God's people" (cf 1:2). Paul has experienced in Ephesus how Stephanas ministered to the needs, together with Fortunatus and Achaicus, as their arrivals gave joy to Paul while he was separated from the church in Corinth.

Final greetings (16:19–24)
In verses 19–24, Paul forwards the greetings of the churches in the province of Asia, of which Ephesus is the capital, as his ministry has expanded beyond that one city. Other co-workers also sent their greetings, including Priscilla and Aquila, and Paul calls the Corinthians to greet each other "as members of a holy brotherhood". Almost to the end, Paul himself took the pen and wrote his personal blessings, as well as curse to those who preach another gospel (cf. Galatians 1:8–9), but ended the letter with the greeting of grace as he added his love in Jesus to the congregation, despite their attitudes towards him, to follow the example of Jesus's love, that never changes.

Verse 19

"Asia" in the narrower sense, only the western coastlands of Asia Minor, (see on Acts 2:9) or Lydian Asia, where Ephesus is the capital.

Verse 21

This statement suggests that the majority of this epistle may have actually been scribed by someone else, and many interpreters suggest that Sosthenes was the amanuensis of the Epistle (see 1 Corinthians 1:1).

Verse 22

"Lord Jesus Christ": The Vulgate Latin, the Syriac and Ethiopian versions read "our Lord".
"Anathema": Hebrew: ; signifies "anything separated and devoted to holy uses" as also used in the Septuagint in Leviticus 27:28, and in Luke 21:5. If isolated to any other purposes, may entail a curse on persons, so it is often translated "accursed", as in Romans 9:3; 1 Corinthians 12:3; Galatians 1:8–9. Here it is suggested that the persons who do not love Jesus as the Lord should be separated from their communion, as rendered in the Arabic version, "let him be separated", i.e., from the church.
"Maranatha": consisting of two words, maran atha, "our Lord comes", as added by the apostle Paul. The Ethiopian version, joining it with the former word, renders the whole "let him be anathema in the coming of our Lord".

See also
 Galatia
 Jerusalem
 Macedonia
 Related Bible parts: Acts 18, 1 Corinthians 1, 1 Thessalonians 1, 2 Timothy 4, Revelation 22.

References

Sources

External links 
 King James Bible - Wikisource
English Translation with Parallel Latin Vulgate
Online Bible at GospelHall.org (ESV, KJV, Darby, American Standard Version, Bible in Basic English)
Multiple bible versions at Bible Gateway (NKJV, NIV, NRSV etc.)

16